Gadaipur is a village in Pataudi Mandal in Gurgaon District, Haryana, India.

Quni Daultabad is a nearby village. Shri Rakesh Thakran is the present sarpanch of the village. Shri Omkar Thakran(Indian Airforce) and Shri Jhabar Sing Thakran(Indian Army) are notable person from the village.

Nearby schools

 Ashram Hari Mandir Sanskrit Vidyalaya
 MD Senior Secondary School
 Keshav Senior Secondary School
 New Happy Child Senior Secondary School

References 

Villages in Gurgaon district